Edward Agyeman-Duah (born 17 October 1973) is a retired Ghanaian football defender. He was a squad member at the 1994 and 1998 Africa Cup of Nations.

References

1973 births
Living people
Ghanaian footballers
Ghana international footballers
1994 African Cup of Nations players
1998 African Cup of Nations players
Asante Kotoko S.C. players
Ashanti Gold SC players
Accra Hearts of Oak S.C. players
Association football defenders